This is a list of notable companies based in Japan. For further information on the types of business entities in this country and their abbreviations, see "Business entities in Japan". Note that 株式会社 can be (and frequently is) read both kabushiki kaisha and kabushiki gaisha (with or without a hyphen).



Largest firms

This list shows firms in the Fortune Global 500, which ranks firms by total revenues reported before 31 March 2017.

0-9

A

B

C

D

E

F

G

H

I

J

K

L

M

N

O

P

R

S

T

U

V

W

Y

Z

Former companies, including acquired and merged ones

 Data East - went into Bankruptcy
 Dream Stage Entertainment
 Daiei Film - went into Bankruptcy, later became part of Tokuma Shoten and now part of Kadokawa Pictures
 Japanese National Railways 日本国有鉄道 - Reorganized into Japan Railways Group
 Japan Post 日本郵政公社 - Reorganized into Japan Post Group
 Prince Motor
 Square and Enix - Merged to form Square Enix 
 Daiichi Pharmaceutical Co. and Sankyo Co. - Merged to form  Daiichi Sankyo 
 Yamanouchi Pharmaceutical and Fujisawa Pharmaceutical - Merged to form Astellas Pharma
 Yaohan
 Tomen - Acquired by Toyota Tsusho
 Nichimen and Nissho Iwai - Merged to form Sojitz

See also
 Keiretsu
 Zaibatsu
 List of railway companies in Japan

References

External links

Japan